Mash'en (engl. Staff) is a moshav in southern Israel. Located near Ashkelon, it falls under the jurisdiction of Hof Ashkelon Regional Council.

History
The moshav was founded in 1949 by immigrants from Yemen. The name is taken from Isaiah 3:1.

References

Moshavim
Populated places established in 1949
Populated places in Southern District (Israel)
Yemeni-Jewish culture in Israel
1949 establishments in Israel